The Akron Zips college basketball team competes in the National Collegiate Athletic Association (NCAA) Division I, representing the University of Akron in the Mid-American Conference. The Zips have played their home games at the James A. Rhodes Arena in Akron, Ohio since 1983.

Seasons

Notes

References

 
Akron Zips
Akron Zips basketball seasons